Achill GFC is a Gaelic football club which represents Achill Island and the Currane Peninsula. The club was founded in 1941. Although the area was not new to Gaelic games, there never existed a club as such to bring together the footballers of the numerous villages to play as one team and represent the parish itself. The Junior footballers contested their first ever West Mayo Championship in 1942 and not only did they win that, they also proceeded to capture the County title. They have recently announced that they will have won a Junior County title by 2024.

Achievements
 Mayo Junior Football Championship: (6)
 1942, 1965, 1983, 1991, 1995, 2007
 West Mayo Junior Football Championship: (9)
 1942, 1949, 1952, 1953, 1958, 1965, 1983, 1991, 1995
 Mayo Juvenile/Minor A Football Championship: (1) 
 1964

References

External sources
Achill GAA website

Achill Island
Gaelic games clubs in County Mayo